Li Fung-ying  (born 2 December 1950 in Hong Kong) is a trades unionist in Hong Kong. She is the third vice-chairperson of the Federation of Hong Kong and Kowloon Labour Unions, the third largest trade union in Hong Kong. Until 2012, she was a member of the Legislative Council of Hong Kong (Legco), in the Labour functional constituency.

Although the Federation of Hong Kong and Kowloon Labour Unions is the subsidiary trade union of the Hong Kong Confederation of Trade Unions (pro-democracy camp), Li's political stance is categorized to be in pro-Beijing camp in the Legco.

External links
Official Site of Federation of Hong Kong and Kowloon Labour Unions

References

1950 births
Living people
Hong Kong trade unionists
Members of the Order of the British Empire
Recipients of the Bronze Bauhinia Star
Recipients of the Silver Bauhinia Star
Progressive Hong Kong Society politicians
HK LegCo Members 2000–2004
HK LegCo Members 2004–2008
HK LegCo Members 2008–2012
Members of the Selection Committee of Hong Kong
Indigenous inhabitants of the New Territories in Hong Kong
Hong Kong people of Hakka descent